Left-Handed Wife is a 2019 South Korean television series starring Lee Soo-kyung and Kim Jin-woo. It aired from January 2 to May 31, 2019 on KBS2. It is also the first KBS daily drama not to premiere on a Monday.

Cast

Main
 Lee Soo-kyung as Oh San-ha
An employee at the product development division of a cosmetics company.
 Kim Jin-woo as Park Do-kyung: Heir apparent of the Aura Group. Esther Jang's boyfriend.
 Song Won-seok as Lee Soo-ho: A doctor working as a resident in a hospital's emergency department. San-ha's husband.
 Jin Tae-hyun as Kim Nam-joon
An associate to Aura Group's chairman. 
 Ha Yeon-joo as Esther Jang
A curator at the Aura Museum (a subsidiary of Aura Group).

Supporting

People around San-ha
 Kang Nam-gil as Oh Chang-soo, San-ha and Seul-ha's dad who went blind in the beginning of the series.
 Kim Seo-ra as Baek Geum-hee, San-ha and Seul-ha's mom.
 Park Yoo-na as Oh Seul-ha, Oh San-ha's younger sister.

People around Do-kyung
 Kim Byung-ki as Park Sun-tae
Aura Group's chairman and Do-kyung's grandfather.
 Sunwoo Yong-nyeo as Cheon Sun-im
Do-kyung & Soo-ho's grandmother
 Jung Chan as Park Kang-chul
Aura's vice chairman and Do-kyung's father & Soo-ho's paternal uncle
 Lee Seung-yeon as Cho Ae-ra
 Director of Aura Museum, Do-kyung and Nam-joon's mom, Kang-chul's wife whom he later divorced.
 Kim Joon-eui as Park Noah
 Do-kyung and Esther's son out of wedlock.

Ratings
In this table,  represent the lowest ratings and  represent the highest ratings.

Notes

References

External links
  
 
 

Korean Broadcasting System television dramas
2019 South Korean television series debuts
2019 South Korean television series endings
Korean-language television shows
South Korean melodrama television series
Television series by Pan Entertainment